The silvery-cheeked hornbill (Bycanistes brevis) is a large species of hornbill found in Africa. Silvery-cheeked hornbills are residents of the tall evergreen forests of East Africa from Ethiopia to South Africa. In Zimbabwe it is threatened by habitat destruction and its presence in South Africa is marginal, but it remains locally fairly common, especially in the northern and central parts of its range.

Description 
It measures  in length, and has a very large cream-colored casque on the beak.  The head is silver-grey and the rest of the plumage is iridescent black, except for the white rump, lower back, thighs, vent and tip of the outer tail-feathers. The sexes are similar except the female has a smaller casque and reddish skin around the eyes.

Diet 
It is omnivorous, feeding on fruits, insects, small birds, rodents, small reptiles and centipedes.

Behaviour 
Usually they live in pairs and sometimes roost in flocks of hundreds of individuals. They breed in spring (September and October; at least in part of its range) and lay clutches of one to three white eggs, incubated for 40 days. The young remain with both parents for about 80 days.

Gallery

References

BirdLife Species Factsheet.

External links
 Silvery-cheeked hornbill - Species text in The Atlas of Southern African Birds.

silvery-cheeked hornbill
Birds of East Africa
silvery-cheeked hornbill
silvery-cheeked hornbill